Craig Ward McLanahan (January 15, 1883 – December 11, 1974) was an American track and field athlete who competed in the 1904 Summer Olympics.

In 1904 he finished fourth in pole vault competition. He also participated in the 110 metre hurdles event but was eliminated in the first round.

He was born in Hollidaysburg, Pennsylvania.

References

External links
sports reference
list of American athletes

1883 births
1974 deaths
American male pole vaulters
American male hurdlers
Olympic track and field athletes of the United States
Athletes (track and field) at the 1904 Summer Olympics
People from Hollidaysburg, Pennsylvania